Pilosocereus azulensis is a species of plant in the family Cactaceae. It is endemic to Brazil.  Its natural habitat is subtropical or tropical dry forests. It is threatened by habitat loss.

References

azulensis
Cacti of South America
Endemic flora of Brazil
Critically endangered plants
Critically endangered flora of South America
Taxonomy articles created by Polbot